The 1916 Southern Intercollegiate Athletic Association football season  was the college football games played by the member schools of the Southern Intercollegiate Athletic Association as part of the 1916 college football season. The season began on September 23. Georgia Tech and Tennessee tied for the conference championship. Tech beat Cumberland 222–0.

Regular season

SIAA teams in bold.

Week One

Week Two

Week Three

Week Four

Week Five

Week Six

Week Seven

Week Eight

Week Nine

Week Ten

Week Eleven

Awards and honors

All-Americans

E – Graham Vowell, Tennessee (WC-3)
C – Pup Phillips, Georgia Tech (WC-3)
QB – Irby Curry, Vanderbilt (WC-3)
HB – Everett Strupper, Georgia Tech (PP-1 [e])

All-Southern team

The following includes the composite All-Southern team formed by the selection of 4 newspapers,

See also
1916 Cumberland vs. Georgia Tech football game

References